is a former Japanese football player and politician, an independent and member of the House of Councillors in the Diet (national legislature). A native of Matsuyama, Ehime and graduate of Waseda University, he was elected for the first time in 2007.

Club statistics

References

External links 

 
  in Japanese.

1975 births
Living people
Waseda University alumni
Association football people from Ehime Prefecture
Japanese footballers
J2 League players
Japan Football League players
Ehime FC players
Japanese expatriate footballers
Japanese expatriate sportspeople in Germany
Expatriate footballers in Germany
Japanese sportsperson-politicians
Members of the House of Councillors (Japan)
Association football forwards
21st-century Japanese politicians